Cacciaguida degli Elisei (c. 1098 – c. 1148) was an Italian crusader, the great-great-grandfather of Dante Alighieri.

Little is known about his life. He was born in Florence, and two documents from 1189 and 1201 mention his existence. The 1189 document lists his sons as Preitenetto and Alighiero, the latter being Dante's great-grandfather, and the source of his surname. 

All other details of his biography are those from his most famous descendant's works. Dante recounts that Cacciaguida joined the Second Crusade and was there knighted by Emperor Conrad III before dying in the Holy Land.

Dante meets Cacciaguida in Paradiso, precisely in the canti XV-XVII. Cacciaguida is the only ancestor of Dante he encounters (although Alighiero is mentioned as remaining in the first level of Purgatory), and the elder serves as a father figure to the poet, and a parallel to Virgil's Aeneas meeting with his own father Anchises. As Dante addressed him:

Paradiso Canto XVI, 16-21 (Longfellow trans.).

Apart from their literary value, the canti are important for the information they provide about Florence in the 12th century. In the canto XVII, Cacciaguida forecasts Dante's future, namely his exile from Florence and the solitude of his late years.

References

1090s births
1140s deaths
Year of birth uncertain
Year of death uncertain
People from the Province of Florence
Italian soldiers
Christians of the Crusades
12th-century Italian people